This is a list of media for the Xenosaga series owned by Namco Bandai.

Video games

Main series

Spin-offs

Animation

Albums and singles

Printed media

Japanese

English

Other media

References 

Media
Xenosaga
Xenosaga